LA-25 is a constituency of Azad Kashmir Legislative Assembly which was is currently by the Chaudhary Shehzad Mehmood formerly of Pakistan Muslim League (N), now Pakistan Tehreek-e-Insaf. As of 25 July 2021, Syed Bazil Naqvi of Pakistan People's Party has won the majority to be the next constituent of LA-25. It covers the area of Lachrat in Muzaffarabad District of Azad Kashmir, Pakistan.

Election 2016

elections were held in this constituency on 21 July 2016.

Muzaffarabad District
Azad Kashmir Legislative Assembly constituencies